Niles Fitch (born July 12, 2001) is an American actor who began his career as a child actor. He gained prominence through his role in the NBC series This Is Us. He received praise for his role as Quinton in the drama film The Fallout (2021).

Personal life
Fitch was born in Atlanta, Georgia to Frederick and Nakata Fitch, who encouraged his modelling career after noticing he received numerous compliments from strangers regarding his smile. Seeing that he enjoyed the arts, they invested in him by downsizing and moving to New York City where his career manifested in television and on broadway. Niles currently lives in Los Angeles, California where he studies at the University of Southern California, School of Cinematic Arts. He has expressed a desire to be known as a separate entity from creative labels and hence, is dabbling in behind-the-camera work in addition to acting and related artistic endeavours. His father, Frederick, died from lupus when Niles was 12 years old. He has since collaborated with Lupus LA as an ambassador in spreading awareness- contributing to the lives of people who live with lupus.

Fitch was the cousin of Rayshard Brooks, a 27-year-old African American man fatally shot by the Atlanta Police Department on June 12, 2020.

Career
Fitch started print modeling when he was four years old. His first job was in a back-to-school ad for Parisian. He then made his stage debut in the 2012 North American tour of The Lion King as Young Simba's replacement. He also played Emmanuel in the 2014 Off-Broadway show, Our Lady of Kibeho.

He made his television debut with a guest appearance in Tyler Perry's House of Payne, followed by a recurring role in Season 7 of Army Wives. His early film credits include St. Vincent and Roman J. Israel, Esq.

Fitch was cast to play a young version of Randall Pearson in the NBC series This Is Us, a role that has won him an ensemble Screen Actors Guild Award. He, along with the rest of the teenage cast, was promoted to series regular from Season 2 onwards.

Fitch had roles in 2019 films If Not Now, When? and Miss Virginia. In May 2019, it was announced that Fitch would star as Prince Tuma in the 2020 Disney+ film Secret Society of Second-Born Royals. In August 2020 it was announced that Fitch had begun filming The Fallout.

Filmography

Film

Television

Stage

Awards and nominations

References

External links
 

Living people
2001 births
21st-century American male actors
African-American male actors
African-American male child actors
American male child actors
Male actors from Atlanta
21st-century African-American people